Marcus St. James (born Marcus Weiner) is a fictional character in the American comedy-drama series Ugly Betty and spin-off web-series Mode After Hours. He is played by Michael Urie.

Background
Marc, who hails from Schenectady, New York, is the personal assistant of Wilhelmina Slater, the creative editor at MODE magazine. He is very loyal to Wilhelmina and so far he will do whatever it will take to help his boss succeed in her goal to become the magazine's editor by conspiring with both his boss and magazine receptionist Amanda Sommers to sabotage the two people responsible for costing Wilhelmina the top job, and in particular, ruin the 'beauty' of the magazine's workplace: Daniel Meade and Betty Suarez, respectively. Despite his attempts at scheming and his efforts to derail the two, Marc usually fails, at times finding himself at the mercy of his boss' wrath, even though he has his own agendas, as hinted in "Filing for the Enemy."

Personal life
References to Marc's sexuality are coy in the first season. He behaves in a stereotypically flamboyant manner and makes puns and witty jokes on suggestive terms like "flaming" and "out." Before coming out to his mother, he long claimed to have a girlfriend who lives in Canada. Marc also mentions having used Amanda as a beard for two years when with his family.

When Marc's mother, played by Patti LuPone, comes to visit, Marc uses Betty as a fake girlfriend to cover up his sexuality and they have dinner at Betty's house. When she calls Betty's effeminate nephew Justin "swishy", Marc defends the boy and tacitly reveals his own "swishness" and homosexuality. Scandalized, she leaves for home. While a little sad at first over his mother's rejection of his sexual orientation, he nonetheless is also happy to live life on his own terms.

In Season Two, Marc begins dating Cliff, a photographer whose scruffy  and overweight appearance is at once charming and distressing to the fashion-conscious Marc. Their relationship gets off to a rocky start when Marc doesn't recognize Cliff's invitation to a movie and dinner as a date. Subsequently, Marc has to overcome his embarrassment of Cliff, which he does after Cliff dumps him. The pair's first public date is Wilhelmina's wedding to Bradford Meade. They got engaged but after Marc cheated on Cliff, they broke it off.

Marc has brief though recurring run-ins with Justin.  In the first season, Marc advises the fashion-conscious Justin to "Be who you are, wear what you want. Just learn how to run real fast." Marc also mentors Justin while he interns at MODE in Season Two.

Marc's best friend is Amanda. The two share spiteful fun in teasing Betty (and others). Marc supported Amanda during her secret relationship with a straight designer who publicly pretended to be gay to help his career in the fashion industry. Marc supports Amanda in her various personal issues, including her discovery Fey Sommers is her birth mother, the search for her birth father, and Amanda's capitalization on the 15 minutes of fame that being Fey's love child gives her. Despite their frequent participation in mean-spirited antics, Marc and Amanda sometimes encourage each other to act morally. For example, Marc encourages Amanda to hand over the letters and perfume for presentation at Claire Meade's murder trial, evidence resulting in Claire's exoneration.

Marc's relationship with Betty is largely adversarial, and he frequently insults and humiliates her, often with the help of Amanda. As time passes however, and their professional positions become more aligned, their relationship develops into a simultaneous rivalry and camaraderie. When Wilhelmina temporarily becomes Editor-in-Chief of MODE, she spitefully lures Betty (who had left with Daniel) away from Daniel and back to MODE. However, when Wilhelmina begins to see potential in Betty, Marc felt betrayed and gives Betty a sack full of letters to shred. It initially appears he is demeaning Betty, but Betty learns the letters are Daniel's previously unseen fan mail. Their discovery results in Wilhelmina's demotion to Creative Director and Daniel's reinstatement as Editor-in-Chief at MODE—and Betty's reinstatement as his assistant. Marc admitted to Betty he was motivated to show her the letters out of jealousy.

After completing the YETI program alongside Betty in season 3, Marc and Betty find themselves vying for the only available editor space at MODE. Ultimately, the choice is left up to Wilhelmina and Daniel, who flip a coin. In the season 3 finale, the coin favors Betty, and having lost the editor's position, Marc is last seen being consoled by Amanda, his dreams temporarily dashed. But he becomes the Junior Fashion Editor now when he gets the promotion from Wilhelmina.

In the final episode it is implied that the new Editor in Chief of Mode Wilhelmina has made Marc the new Creative Director.

Profession

At work, Marc fulfills a variety of tasks for Wilhelmina, notably including abetting her schemes to take over MODE and, in the second season, Meade Publications. When he talks, she threatens him.  On occasion, she promised to replace him with some other "curly-haired, effeminate sycophant," five of whom she claims to have on speed dial. Among the assignments Marc has fulfilled for Wilhelmina are hitting her so she could claim a jealous Claire Meade had her beaten. Wilhelmina claims to have no personal regard for Marc, on one occasion trading him to the cosmetics mogul Fabia so Fabia would move her own wedding date, leaving June clear for Wilhelmina. But seeing Marc as one of Fabia's maltreated boy toys brought out a strain of carefully concealed remorse in Wilhelmina, and she conceded the coveted June wedding to Fabia in order to get Marc back.

Marc was also one of the first people to know about Fey Sommers' rediscovered "Love Dungeon" adjoining the "Closet." Only three others in the office know about the secret retreat as of the second-season episode "It's a Nice Day for a Posh Wedding": Amanda, Christina and Betty. Henry would be the fourth person who would find out in "I See Me, I.C.U."

Connections

Cliff St. Paul - Photographer and film buff, this un-trendy 'nice guy' is just what Marc's been looking for in a serious relationship. Although their relationship starts out a little rough as Marc cancels their date to go out with an underwear model, Marc eventually chooses Cliff over the model. The two are seen in the fifth episode of the second season watching Psycho together and holding hands. In the third season, Cliff asks Marc to move in with him which prompts Marc to sleep with someone else. Feeling guilty, Marc asks Cliff to marry him. Eventually, Marc tells Cliff the truth and they break up in the episode "Tornado Girl" (3.8).
Wilhelmina Slater - Former creative Director at MODE then [Co] Editor-in-chief and the sole editor-in-chief of Mode magazine; Wilhelmina will usually confidently hand out orders to Marc, especially when it comes dealing with Daniel and Betty. When Marc accidentally stumbles onto Wilhelmina's plans to take over Meade Publications, he turns that around by forcing Wilhelmina into buying his silence with financial security and a new Hummer H2 in order to keep her secret from leaking out. In the end, it is Marc who persuades Wilhelmina to finally turn over a new leaf.
Betty Suarez - Former features editor at MODE then co-owner of a London magazine; He constantly mocks Betty (he has captured her screw-ups on cellphone and then proclaims "I think I just found my new screen-saver!" after downloading it, and even dressed up as her for Halloween in which he almost got a raise from Wilhelmina, who then quickly changed her mind after saying she can barely stand seeing the "real" one), as long as he doesn't endure Betty's wrath since she has threatened him with a Queens-style beating. She has also threatened Marc that she'll expose his personal web page (with revealing images of himself) after she saw his screen-saver shrine to Betty and her mishaps; he deleted them immediately. Betty even once duped Marc into owing her a favor by giving him the coveted Gucci bag he wanted from the MODE closet. It actually turned out to be a knock-off and Marc wouldn't have admitted it was fake because it would have meant Betty tricked him. Marc and Betty, although initially hostile, came to love one another as best friends.
Justin Suarez - Betty's nephew; When Justin came to her workplace Marc seemed to like Justin, even giving him advice on dealing with bullies and complimenting him on his outfits.  He also made Justin feel better about his father's death. However, when pretending to date Betty, he couldn't remember who Justin was, and mistakenly thinking he was Betty's son, of which Justin has to correct him several times. In the fourth season they became particularly close, to the point where Hilda, Justin's mother, confronts him in the episode "The Butterfly Effect Part 1" because she feels like she is losing her son. Marc responds "You're his mother. In some areas... I have an edge." Marc continues to help Justin with bullying and his sexuality throughout the season.
Amanda Sommers - Receptionist at MODE; a loyal ally; they share a dislike for Betty and enjoy humiliating her. In one episode Marc and Amanda were willing to work with Betty in an attempt to keep their jobs, even at the cost of lying to Wilhelmina, which got worse after he and Amanda make a prank call to the mystery woman while they were in Wilhelmina's office, but he used that to his advantage by telling Amanda it will cost her after Wilhelmina saw her text message pinning him as the culprit.  In "Don't Ask Don't Tell" it is revealed Marc has pretended in the past Amanda was his girlfriend in order to fool his mother when she visited him. Marc later told his mother he had broken up with Amanda because of her sex and drug addictions.
Christina McKinney - Seamstress at MODE; Christina has a love-hate rivalry with Marc, with whom she constantly bickers, mostly because of her work.  In the tenth episode she told "Santa Claus" she wishes that Marc had "...Courage" because she knows how cowardly Marc is, especially concerning Wilhelmina. They formed a friendly truce during the fifteenth episode ("Derailed") when Christina needed help in designing an Oscar-worthy dress in one night, only to have the opportunity destroyed by a manipulative Wilhelmina. Marc ended up trying to comfort Christina over this incident by telling her it "Gets Easier". During this brief show of compassion he shows a side suggesting he doesn't like the things Wilhelmina makes him do either, thereby creating a link between himself and Christina.
Alexis Meade - Co-Editor-In-Chief at MODE; It turned out when Alexis was Alex, Marc had a crush on him before Daniel's brother changed genders. He lost interest after Alexis' return. This revelation was featured in a deleted scene from the Season 1 DVD.
Henry Grubstick - Accountant at Meade Publications; Along with Amanda, Marc likes to torture him, especially when it involves Betty or when they demand their paychecks...as long as they don't endure his wrath (as they did in "Betty's Wait Problem"). He also referred to Henry as having "body karate" (well-built) in another episode, as he showed a cellphone picture he took of him to Amanda, assuring Betty he "so did not peek".

Critical response
Originally, Wilhelmina was supposed to be so mean she would fire an assistant every week, but Marc proved to be a popular character and got the job permanently.

Slate magazine named the character as one of the reasons they were looking forward to the return of the show in fall 2007.

Notes

Footnotes

Ugly Betty characters
Fictional cheerleaders
Fictional henchmen
Fictional gay males
Fictional secretaries
Fictional characters from New York (state)
Fictional LGBT characters in television